Cucumber cake is a cake prepared using cucumber as a primary ingredient. Additional ingredients may include typical cake ingredients such as flour, sugar, eggs and leavening. It may be served as a dessert cake, and some versions are topped with an icing.

Tavsoli
Cucumber cake may be referred to as tavsoli or tausali, and is a dish in Goan cuisine.  Tavsoli is prepared using cucumber, and additional ingredients may include rice, coconut, jaggery, ghee, cashews and cardamom. Turmeric leaves may be placed atop the cake prior to baking, which adds flavor. It may be served as a breakfast dish, and may be prepared in the style of a dhokla and steamed.

See also

 Cucumber sandwich
 List of cakes
Zucchini bread

References

Further reading
 

Cakes
Goan cuisine
Cake